Laemanctus is a genus of lizards in the family Corytophanidae. Species in the genus Laemanctus are commonly referred to as conehead lizards or casquehead iguanas. The genus is endemic to Central America.

Description
Lizards of the genus Laemanctus exhibit the following characters. The tympanum is distinct. The plane of the top of the head slopes forward, and the occipital region is raised and extends beyond the occiput. The body is laterally compressed, and is covered with imbricate keeled scales. A strong transverse gular fold is present, but a gular pouch is absent. The limbs are very long, and the infradigital lamellae have a median tubercle-like keel. Femoral pores are absent. The tail is very long, and is round in cross section. The lateral teeth are tricuspid, and pterygoid teeth are present. The clavicle is loop-shaped proximally. A sternal fontanelle is absent. Abdominal ribs are absent.

Species and subspecies
The genus Laemanctus consists of four species which are recognized as being valid. Two of these species have recognized subspecies.

Laemanctus julioi McCranie, 2018 – Julio's casquehead iguana
Laemanctus longipes Wiegmann, 1834  – eastern casquehead iguana
Laemanctus longipes deborrei Boulenger, 1877
Laemanctus longipes longipes Wiegmann, 1834
Laemanctus serratus Cope, 1864 – serrated casquehead iguana
Laemanctus serratus alticoronatus Cope, 1866
Laemanctus serratus serratus Cope, 1864
Laemanctus waltersi Schmidt, 1933 – Walters's casquehead iguana

References

Further reading
McCoy CJ (1968). "A review of the genus Laemanctus (Reptilia, Iguanidae)". Copeia 1968 (4): 665–678.
McCranie JR (2018). "The Lizards, Crocodiles, and Turtles of Honduras. Systematics, Distribution, and Conservation". Bulletin of the Museum of Comparative Zoology 15 (1): 1–129.
Wiegmann AFA (1834). Herpetologia Mexicana, seu Descriptio Amphibiorum Novae Hispaniae, quae Itineribus Comitis de Sack, Ferdinandi Deppe et Chr. Guil. Schiede in Museum Berolinense Pervenerunt. Pars Prima, Saurorum Species Amplectens. Adiecto Systematis Saurorum Prodromo, Additisque Multis in hunc Amphibiorum Ordinem Observationibus. Berlin: C.G. Lüderitz. vi + 54 pp. + Plates I-X. (Laemanctus, new genus, pp. 45–46). (in Latin).

Laemanctus
Lizard genera
Taxa named by Arend Friedrich August Wiegmann